Triphenylmethyl chloride or trityl chloride (TrCl) is a white solid with the chemical formula C19H15Cl. It is an alkyl halide, sometimes used to introduce the trityl protecting group.

Preparation
Triphenylmethyl chloride is commercially available. It may be prepared by the reaction of triphenylmethanol with acetyl chloride, or by the Friedel–Crafts alkylation of benzene with carbon tetrachloride to give the trityl chloride-aluminium chloride adduct, which is then hydrolyzed.

Reactions
Triphenylmethylsodium can be prepared from trityl chloride dissolved in an aprotic solvent and sodium:
(C6H5)3CCl  +  2 Na   →  (C6H5)3CNa  +  NaCl

Reaction with silver hexafluorophosphate gives triphenylmethyl hexafluorophosphate.

Trityl chloride reacts with zinc in nonpolar solvents (e.g. benzene) to form Gomberg's dimer.
2 (C6H5)3CCl  +  Zn   →  ((C6H5)3C)2  +  ZnCl2

See also
 Triphenylmethyl radical
 Triphenylmethane
 Triphenylmethyl hexafluorophosphate
 Triphenylmethanol
 Gomberg's dimer

References

Alkylating agents
Organochlorides
Phenyl compounds